Ctenanthe lubbersiana, called the bamburanta, is a species of flowering plant in the genus Ctenanthe, native to Brazil. It has gained the Royal Horticultural Society's Award of Garden Merit as a subtropical hothouse ornamental.

References

House plants
Marantaceae
Endemic flora of Brazil
Plants described in 1890